This page summarizes 2017 in Estonian football.

National teams 

The home team or the team that is designated as the home team is listed in the left column; the away team is in the right column.

Senior

Friendly matches

FIFA World Cup 2018 qualifying

Men's football

Promotion and relegation 

1. Club did not enter the Championship

Meistriliiga

Esiliiga

Esiliiga B

II Liiga

North/East

South/West

III Liiga

North

East

South

West

IV liiga

North/East

North/West

South

Promotion and relegation play-offs
In 2017, no promotion play-offs were played in the top three leagues (Meistriliiga, Esiliiga and Esiliiga B), because of the merging of Tallinna FC Levadia and FCI Tallinn and the relegation of JK Sillamäe Kalev

To II Liiga

To III Liiga

Women's football

Naiste Meistriliiga

Cup competitions

Estonian Cup 

Home teams listed on top of bracket. (AET): At Extra Time

References 

 
Seasons in Estonian football